Pittard is an English and French surname. Notable people with the name include:

Alan Pittard (1902–1992), Australian politician
 Charles Pittard (born 1812), founder of Pittards leather manufacturer, based in Yeovil, Somerset and in Ethiopia
Dana J.H. Pittard, U.S. military officer
Denis Pittard (born 1945), Australian rugby league footballer
Eugène Pittard (1867–1962), Swiss anthropologist
Jasper Pittard (born 1991), Australian rules footballer
Jill Pittard (born 1977), English badminton player

See also
Mount Pittard, a peak in Antarctica

English-language surnames
French-language surnames